Francis Coutou (15 March 1947 – 17 January 2019) was a French field hockey player. He competed in the men's tournament at the 1972 Summer Olympics.

References

External links
 

1947 births
2019 deaths
French male field hockey players
Olympic field hockey players of France
Field hockey players at the 1972 Summer Olympics
Place of birth missing